In linear algebra, a Householder transformation (also known as a Householder reflection or elementary reflector) is a linear transformation that describes a reflection about a plane or hyperplane containing the origin. The Householder transformation was used in a 1958 paper by Alston Scott Householder.

Its analogue over general inner product spaces is the Householder operator.

Definition

Transformation

The reflection hyperplane can be defined by its normal vector, a unit vector  (a vector with length ) that is orthogonal to the hyperplane. The reflection of a point  about this hyperplane is the linear transformation:

 

where  is given as a column unit vector with Hermitian transpose .

Householder matrix

The matrix constructed from this transformation can be expressed in terms of an outer product as:

 

is known as the Householder matrix, where  is the identity matrix.

Properties

The Householder matrix has the following properties:
 it is Hermitian: ,
 it is unitary: ,
 hence it is involutory: .
 A Householder matrix has eigenvalues . Also, notice , and so  is an eigenvalue with multiplicity .

Applications

Geometric optics

In geometric optics, specular reflection can be expressed in terms of the Householder matrix (see ).

Numerical linear algebra

Householder transformations are widely used in numerical linear algebra, for example, to annihilate the entries below the main diagonal of a matrix, to perform QR decompositions and in the first step of the QR algorithm. They are also widely used for transforming to a Hessenberg form. For symmetric or Hermitian matrices, the symmetry can be preserved, resulting in tridiagonalization.

QR decomposition

Householder reflections can be used to calculate QR decompositions by reflecting first one column of a matrix onto a multiple of a standard basis vector, calculating the transformation matrix, multiplying it with the original matrix and then recursing down the  minors of that product.

Tridiagonalization 

This procedure is presented in Numerical Analysis by Burden and Faires.

 for each 

Then compute:

Continuing in this manner, the tridiagonal and symmetric matrix is formed.

Examples

In this example, also from Burden and Faires, the given matrix is transformed to the similar tridiagonal matrix A3 by using the Householder method.

 

Following those steps in the Householder method, we have:

The first Householder matrix:
 

Used  to form
 

As we can see, the final result is a tridiagonal symmetric matrix which is similar to the original one. The process is finished after two steps.

Computational and theoretical relationship to other unitary transformations 

The Householder transformation is a reflection about a hyperplane with unit normal vector , as stated earlier. An -by- unitary transformation  satisfies . Taking the determinant (-th power of the geometric mean) and trace (proportional to arithmetic mean) of a unitary matrix  reveals that its eigenvalues  have unit modulus. This can be seen directly and swiftly:

Since arithmetic and geometric means are equal if the variables are constant (see inequality of arithmetic and geometric means), we establish the claim of unit modulus.

For the case of real valued unitary matrices we obtain orthogonal matrices, . It follows rather readily (see orthogonal matrix) that any orthogonal matrix can be decomposed into a product of 2 by 2 rotations, called Givens Rotations, and Householder reflections. This is appealing intuitively since multiplication of a vector by an orthogonal matrix preserves the length of that vector, and rotations and reflections exhaust the set of (real valued) geometric operations that render invariant a vector's length.

The Householder transformation was shown to have a one-to-one relationship with the canonical coset decomposition of unitary matrices defined in group theory, which can be used to parametrize unitary operators in a very efficient manner.

Finally we note that a single Householder transform, unlike a solitary Givens transform, can act on all columns of a matrix, and as such exhibits the lowest computational cost for QR decomposition and tridiagonalization. The penalty for this "computational optimality" is, of course, that Householder operations cannot be as deeply or efficiently parallelized. As such Householder is preferred for dense matrices on sequential machines, whilst Givens is preferred on sparse matrices, and/or parallel machines.

See also 
 Givens rotation
 Jacobi rotation

Notes

References
 
 
  (Herein Householder Transformation is cited as a top 10 algorithm of this century)
 

Transformation (function)
Matrices
Numerical linear algebra